Donald MacIntyre or McIntyre may refer to:

Donald Macintyre (Indian Army officer) (1831–1903), recipient of the Victoria Cross
Donald Macintyre (Royal Navy officer) (1904–1981), Royal Navy officer in World War II and author
Donal MacIntyre (born 1966), investigative journalist
Donald Macintyre  (journalist), journalist and political commentator for The Independent
Sir Donald McIntyre (born 1934), operatic bass-baritone
Donald McIntyre (New South Wales politician)
Don McIntyre (1915–2013), Australian rules footballer
Donald Macintyre, Scottish Gaelic poet and author of "Òran na Cloiche"
Donald McIntyre (physician) (1891–1954), Scottish gynaecologist
Donald McIntyre (Queensland politician) (1851–1927), member of the Queensland Legislative Assembly